Qeshlaq Sorkheh (also Romanized as Qeshlāq Sorkheh; also known as Qeshlāq Sūrkeh and Susurgha) is a village in Howmeh Rural District, in the Central District of Divandarreh County, Kurdistan Province, Iran. At the 2006 census, its population was 126, in 26 families. The village is populated by Kurds.

References 

Towns and villages in Divandarreh County
Kurdish settlements in Kurdistan Province